Main North Road is the major north-south arterial route through the suburbs north of the Adelaide City Centre in the city of Adelaide, South Australia. It follows the route established in the early years of the colony by explorer John Horrocks and was a major route for farmers and graziers to reach the capital, passing through rich farmland and the Clare Valley wine region. In 2011, the section of road between Gawler to Wilmington was renamed Horrocks Highway.

Route
Main North Road branches from the northern end of O'Connell Street (North Adelaide) and passes through the Adelaide Parklands and the suburbs of Thorngate, Medindie, Medindie Gardens, Nailsworth, Prospect, Sefton Park, Blair Athol and Enfield before reaching the major intersection at Gepps Cross. Here the road forks, with the Port Wakefield Road (A1 - National Highway 1) continuing to the north, and the Main North Road turning northeast and continuing as route A20.

It continues through the outer northern suburbs, passing Mawson Lakes and Salisbury, crossing the Little Para River and passing Elizabeth and Smithfield before entering Gawler. In Gawler, it crosses the South Para and North Para Rivers, and the Barossa Valley Way branches to the east between them. Just north of Gawler, it passes under the Sturt Highway which heads east to the Barossa Valley, Riverland, northern Victoria and New South Wales.

This is where the name Horrocks Highway takes over from the historic name of Main North Road. The environment changes from the urban environment to undulating land, mostly cleared for grain cropping. Several of the towns have grain storage bunkers or silos. It crosses the Light River then crosses and follows the Gilbert River to where the Barrier Highway branches northeast towards Riverton and Burra.

Over the next ridge, it crosses the Wakefield River and enters the southern end of the Clare Valley. The dominant scenery changes from grain crops to grapevines from Auburn to Clare, then returns to grain fields again north of the Hutt River as it passes through the Southern Flinders Ranges. It crosses the Broughton River near Yacka and on to Wilmington at the eastern side of Horrocks Pass. As the Horrocks Highway is in the valley between the southern Flinders Ranges and northern Mount Lofty Ranges, it is in the relatively wetter climate south of Goyder's Line.

Horrocks Highway
Main North Road from Wilmington to Gawler Belt was renamed to Horrocks Highway in 2011 to honour John Horrocks, an early explorer and pioneer in the region. However while Main North Road turns west in Wilmington through Horrocks Pass to join the Augusta Highway as route B56, Horrocks Highway continues north beyond Wilmington as route B82 to Quorn.

Commuter route
In the metropolitan area, the road is a major commuter route to the central business district in the Adelaide city centre.

The portion of Main North Road between the city centre and Mawson Lakes is a 15-minute public transport 'Go Zone', with the maximum wait for a bus being 15 minutes during peak times (7:30 am – 6:30 pm weekdays) and 30 minutes on weekends and evenings. Bus routes via Main North Road generally begin with the prefix "22x". The bus service is provided by SouthLink for Adelaide Metro.

Route numbers
From north to south, the route numbers used along the road are:
 B82 from Wilmington through the Clare Valley and the northern fringes of Gawler;
 B19 through Gawler, where B19 follows Barossa Valley Way through the Barossa Valley wine region;
 A20 from the southern fringes of Gawler to Gepps Cross, in the northern suburbs of Adelaide 
 A1 from Gepps Cross to North Adelaide.

In late 2010 when the Northern Expressway was completed, National Highway A20 was diverted to the new road as National Highway M20. Main North Road and the southern section of the Gawler Bypass Road were then designated as route A52. In late 2016, the Northern Expressway was designated M2, and the designation of Main North Road was reverted back as route A20 to Gepps Cross.

Major intersections

See also

 Highways in Australia
 List of highways in South Australia
 Highway 1 (Australia)
 Highway 1 (South Australia)

References 

Highways in Australia
Roads in Adelaide
Freeways and highways in Adelaide
Highway 1 (Australia)